Fomikha is a rural locality (a selo) in Sergeikhinskoye Rural Settlement, Kameshkovsky District, Vladimir Oblast, Russia. The population was 14 as of 2010.

Geography 
Fomikha is located on the Nerl River, 27 km west of Kameshkovo (the district's administrative centre) by road. Zapolitsy is the nearest rural locality.

References 

Rural localities in Kameshkovsky District
Suzdalsky Uyezd